Agabinae is a subfamily of predaceous diving beetles in the family Dytiscidae. There are about 11 genera and more than 460 described species in Agabinae.

Genera
These 11 genera belong to the subfamily Agabinae:
 Agabinus Crotch, 1873
 Agabus Leach, 1817
 Agametrus Sharp, 1882
 Andonectes Guéorguiev, 1971
 Hydronebrius Jakovlev, 1897
 Hydrotrupes Sharp, 1882
 Ilybiosoma Crotch, 1873
 Ilybius Erichson, 1832
 Leuronectes Sharp, 1882
 Platambus Thomson, 1859
 † Platynectes Régimbart, 1879

References

Further reading

External links

 

Dytiscidae